Shilpa Saklani is an Indian television actress. She known for her role as Ganga Sahil Virani in Kyunki Saas Bhi Kabhi Bahu Thi and Vidhi in Jassi Jaissi Koi Nahin. She was a contestant on the reality shows Nach Baliye 1 and Bigg Boss 7.

Early life
She was born on 5 June in Mumbai.

Career 
Shilpa started her career with Tere Liye, a movie starring Arjun Punj in 2001 which failed at the box office. In 2002, she played a brief role in Na Tum Jaano Na Hum. She joined Ekta Kapoor's Kyunki Saas Bhi Kabhi Bahu Thi as Ganga from 2002 until the end of the show in 2008. She was later seen in Kya Hadsaa Kya Haqeeqat and played the lead role in Lavanya.

In 2005, Saklani participated in Nach Baliye 1 with Apurva. Saklani acted in shows Kkusum, Jassi Jaissi Koi Nahin. In 2009, she participated in Imagine TV's Pati Patni Aur Woh. In 2012, she participated in Survivor India. In 2013, along with her husband Apurva, Saklani participated in Colors TV's Bigg Boss in its seventh season. She survived for five week until she got evicted.

Personal life
Saklani married television and film actor Apurva Agnihotri in 2004.

Filmography

Films

Television

References

External links

Living people
Indian television actresses
Indian soap opera actresses
Bigg Boss (Hindi TV series) contestants